Jim Elliott is the former chairman of the Montana Democratic Party and a former member of the Montana Senate, representing District 7 from 2001 to 2009. He was also a member of the Montana House of Representatives from 1989 through 1997, representing District 72.

In the Senate Jim served as Chairman of three influential senate committees, Taxation, Water Policy, and the Committee on Committees, which assigned senators to committees. Jim's philosophy of "agree happily and disagree respectfully," enabled him to work effectively with both Democrats and Republicans and gave him the ability to be a fair and effective voice for Lincoln, Mineral, Missoula, and Sanders Counties and for the people of the State of Montana.

Honored twice by the Montana Library Association for his fight against governmental agencies' spying on law-abiding citizens (2001 Legislator Award, 2006 Pat Williams Intellectual Freedom Award), Jim is also a Fellow of the Eleanor Roosevelt Global Leadership Institute and the Arthur Fleming Leadership Institute.

Elliott lives in Trout Creek, Montana, He has a daughter living in Los Angeles and a dog named Xena.

External links 
Montana Senate - Jim Elliott official MT State Legislature website
Project Vote Smart - Senator Jim Elliott (MT) profile

1942 births
Living people
Ranchers from Montana
Democratic Party members of the Montana House of Representatives
Democratic Party Montana state senators
People from Pottstown, Pennsylvania
San Francisco State University alumni
State political party chairs of Montana